a

Ambika Sanba is a Nepalese politician. He was elected to the Pratinidhi Sabha in  1994 and 1997 election, as the Communist Party of Nepal (Unified Marxist-Leninist) candidate in the Taplejung-2 constituency.

After the election Sanba was named Minister for Population and Environment in the CPN (UML) cabinet of Man Mohan Adhikari.

In August 2005, after having been missing for seven months, Sanba's family notified the press that he had joined the underground Communist Party of Nepal (Maoist).

References

Government ministers of Nepal
Living people
Communist Party of Nepal (Unified Marxist–Leninist) politicians
Communist Party of Nepal (Maoist Centre) politicians
Nepalese atheists
Year of birth missing (living people)
Nepal MPs 1991–1994
Nepal MPs 1994–1999